Hrušica is a village northwest of Podgrad in the Municipality of Ilirska Bistrica in the Inner Carniola region of Slovenia.

The parish church in the settlement is dedicated to Saint Chrysogonus and belongs to the Koper Diocese.

References

External links

Hrušica on Geopedia

Populated places in the Municipality of Ilirska Bistrica